Bob Holburn was a Canadian football player who played for the BC Lions.

References

BC Lions players
Canadian football running backs
Year of birth missing